The Hunter Sonata 7 is a  small racer-cruiser yacht built in Britain from 1976 to 1990 by Hunter Boats Limited (now British Hunter).  The twin-keeled version is known as the Hunter Duette.

The Sonata was designed by David Thomas, and is a One-Design, Cruiser-Racer Class.  It has a glass-fibre hull, with a low-profile glass-fibre deck, a  Bermuda rigged aluminium mast, and an iron keel (or keels).  It has a relatively large sail area and the rig is a fractional one.  When fitted for cruising it has four berths, with two further occasional bunks.  Mechanical power is provided by a demountable outboard motor mounted on a sliding bracket on the port side of the transom.

The Sonata was built in several forms, with a fin keel, a lifting keel, and as a bilge keeler (with twin keels), when it was called the Hunter Duette. The Duette was fitted out for cruising rather than racing. The Duette was also available with a lifting keel. The same hull was used later with different deck mouldings for other models, including the Hunter Horizon 23. The  Hunter Medina is a scaled-down trailer sailer version of the Sonata design.

Key dimensions
 Length (LOA): 6.90 m
 Length on waterline: 5.60 m
 Beam: 2.60 m
 Sail area: 19.5 m²
 Draught: 1.37m (fin keel)
 Weight: 1115 kg

Racing
The Sonata is a National class in the United Kingdom and is raced across the country.  The class is governed by the National Sonata Association in conjunction with the Royal Yachting Association.

Fleets
There are at least 17 fleets in the world, 15 of which are in the United Kingdom
 Abersoch
 Brixham
 Burnham-on-Crouch
 Christchurch Sailing Club
 Loch Lomond Sailing Club
 Clyde
 Cowes
 Dublin
 Hong Kong
 Isle of Man
 Itchenor
 Medway
 Moray Firth
 Poole
 Scarborough
 South Coast (Hamble & Solent)
 Strangford Lough Yacht Club
 Sunderland
 Tay
 West Mersea
 Windermere
 Whitby

UK National Champions

References

External links
 National Sonata Association web site
 Hunter Medina Association web site

Sailing yachts
1970s sailboat type designs
Sailboat types built by Hunter Boats
Sailboat type designs by British designers